Oaks Historic District or variations may refer to:

in the United States
(by state then city)
Oaks Historic District (Hattiesburg, Mississippi), listed on the NRHP in Mississippi
The Oaks Historic District (Merchantville, New Jersey), listed on the NRHP in New Jersey
White Oaks Historic District, White Oaks, New Mexico, listed on the NRHP in New Mexico
Oaks Historic District (Beaumont, Texas), a neighborhood in Beaumont, Texas, featuring homes from the 1920s to 1950s
Boulevard Oaks Historic District, Houston, Texas, listed on the NRHP in Texas
Bonnie Oaks Historic District, Briggsville, Wisconsin, listed on the NRHP in Wisconsin